Benjamin Ikin (born 21 February 1977) is an Australian former professional rugby league footballer and works as the Football & Performance Director for the Brisbane Broncos. An Australian international and Queensland State of Origin representative centre turned five-eighth, he played his club football for the Gold Coast Seagulls, North Sydney Bears and Brisbane Broncos, with whom he won the 2000 premiership, before being forced into early retirement in 2004 by injury. He was previously the host of NRL 360 on Fox League as well as a commentator for the Nine Network and Fox Sports.

Playing career

According to his 1995 Queensland Origin coach Paul Vautin, he did not actually know who Ikin was before the series. When Ikin first approached Vautin at the beginning of the Origin camp before the series, he actually thought the teenager was a fan seeking an autograph.

Ikin's debut season ended prematurely when he was injured and he signed with the North Sydney Bears in 1996.  Ikin made his debut for Norths in Round 1 1996 against his former club the Gold Coast scoring a try in a 42-26 victory.  Ikin finished the 1996 season as North Sydney's top try scorer.  Ikin played in the club's shock preliminary final loss to St. George.

In the 1997 ARL season, Ikin made 22 appearances as Norths again reached another preliminary final but were defeated 17-12 at the Sydney Football Stadium by the Newcastle Knights.  With less than five minutes to play, the scores were locked at 12-12 after Norths player Michael Buettner scored a try.  Norths player Jason Taylor then had the chance at kicking the goal which would send Norths into their first grand final since 1943.  Taylor who was a reliable goal kicker missed his conversion attempt.  Newcastle then kicked a field goal through Matthew Johns and scored a try on the final siren to win the match.

In the 1998 NRL season, Ikin made 25 appearances for Norths as they reached another finals campaign but were eliminated in the minor semi final against Canterbury 23-2 at North Sydney Oval. At the end of 1998, Ikin went someway toward fulfilling that potential when he was chosen as a reserve in the final two Tests against New Zealand in September, making him currently the last international to be selected from the North Sydney club.  

He then tried to gain a release from his contract to play with premiers the Brisbane Broncos in 1999, but his request was refused.  Reluctantly playing with Norths, he suffered a broken jaw in an off-field incident that kept him sidelined for eight weeks.  Ikin played in North Sydney's final game in the top grade which was against North Queensland in Round 26 1999 at the Willows Sports Complex.  Norths won the match 28-18.

Ikin finally got the chance to link with Brisbane when Norths were forced into a joint venture with Manly-Warringah Sea Eagles in 2000. He finished his first season with the Broncos playing five-eighth in the club's 2000 NRL grand final win over the Sydney Roosters. 

It was later revealed that he played the latter part of the season with a shoulder injury that required surgery during the 2000 off-season. In 2000 Ikin was awarded the Australian Sports Medal for his contribution to Australia's international standing in the sport of rugby league. 

Ikin also considered playing for Wales in the 2000 Rugby League World Cup due to his Welsh heritage through his grandfather

A mainstay of the Queensland State of Origin team, a further knee injury limited Ikin to just 6 matches in 2001 and ruined any chance of extending his Test record.  Ikin made a successful comeback from his injury, even returning to State of Origin duty, but he had lost a lot of his speed and decided to stand down from the Broncos' elite squad at the end of 2003.  Playing for Broncos' feeder club Toowoomba, Ikin was recalled into the Brisbane team during the 2004 representative season and played in 11 games in the latter half of the year.

Ikin's last game in the NRL came in the 2004 elimination final against North Queensland which Brisbane lost 10-0 at the Willows Sports Complex.

Post playing
Ben Ikin was a rugby league commentator for the Nine Network and regularly appeared on The Sunday Footy Show. On 3 June 2009, Ikin resigned from the Nine Network, due to A Current Affair running a story about his father's ill-fated storage business on the Gold Coast.

Until June 2021, Ikin was host of NRL 360 on Fox Sports alongside journalist Paul Kent.

Personal life
Ikin is married to Beth (Elizabeth) Bennett, the daughter of Wayne Bennett, who had coached Ikin at both the Brisbane Broncos and in the Queensland State of Origin and Australian Test teams. However, since the public extra-marital affair of Wayne Bennett that precipitated the end of his 42-year marriage to wife Trish, both Ikin and his wife are now estranged from him.

Sean Ikin, Ben's middle brother, was a successful recording artist with Universal Records from 1999 to 2002.  Sean recorded an independent album in London UK in 2005 called 'Gallery of Murmurs'.

Ikin's youngest brother, Anthony, is a five-time Australian aerobics champion, and was a top-twenty contestant in the first series of So You Think You Can Dance.

References

Sources
Ben Ikin at NRL Stats

1977 births
Living people
Australia national rugby league team players
Australian people of Welsh descent
Australian rugby league players
Brisbane Broncos players
Fox Sports (Australian TV network) people
Gold Coast Chargers players
Nine's Wide World of Sport
North Sydney Bears players
Queensland Rugby League State of Origin players
Recipients of the Australian Sports Medal
Rugby league centres
Rugby league five-eighths
Rugby league hookers
Rugby league players from Brisbane
Toowoomba Clydesdales players
Ben